Mocha is a Java decompiler, which allows programmers to translate a program's bytecode into source code.

A beta version of Mocha was released in 1996, by Dutch developer Hanpeter van Vliet, alongside an obfuscator named Crema. A controversy erupted and he temporarily withdrew Mocha from public distribution. As of 2009 the program is still available for distribution, and may be used freely as long as it is not modified. Borland's JBuilder includes a decompiler based on Mocha. Van Vliet's websites went offline as he died of cancer on December 31, 1996 at the age of 34.

See also
 JAD (JAva Decompiler)
 JD

References

External links
 

Java decompilers
Software obfuscation